Dorceta E. Taylor is an environmental sociologist known for her work on both environmental justice and racism in the environmental movement. She is the Senior Associate Dean of Diversity, Equity, and Inclusion at Yale School of the Environment, as well as a Professor of Environmental Justice. Prior to this, she was the Director of Diversity, Equity, and Inclusion at the University of Michigan's School of Environment and Sustainability (SEAS), where she also served as the James E. Crowfoot Collegiate Professor of Environmental Justice.  Taylor's research has ranged over environmental history, environmental justice, environmental policy, leisure and recreation, gender and development, urban affairs, race relations, collective action and social movements, green jobs, diversity in the environmental field, food insecurity, and urban agriculture.

A scholar of environmental justice, Taylor's work has garnered numerous awards. Her 2009 book, The Environment and the People in American Cities: 1600s-1900s, was the first history of environmental injustice in America. Her 2014 book Toxic Communities has been hailed as a "standard-bearer" for environmental justice scholarship. Her book, The Rise of the American Conservation Movement is a "sweeping social history" that challenges narrative of environmental history and inspires readers to "reconsider nearly everything".

Early life and education

Taylor was born and raised in rural Jamaica. She earned a bachelor's of arts in Environmental Studies and Biology (with honors) from Northeastern Illinois University in Chicago in 1983. She obtained a master's of forest science from Yale University in 1985. She followed with a master's of art and a master's of philosophy in 1988. She received a joint doctoral degree in sociology and forestry and environmental studies from the School of Forestry and the Department of Sociology at Yale University 1991.  She was the first African American woman to earn a doctoral degree from Yale School of Forestry & Environmental Studies.

Academic career

Taylor received a National Science Foundation Minority Post-doctoral Fellowship in 1991 to study ethnic minority environmental activism in Britain.  She affiliated with the University College of London's Department of Geography while she conducted her research.  In 1992 she obtained a Ford Foundation/Rockefeller Foundation Poverty and the Underclass Post-doctoral Fellowship at the University of Michigan. The appointment was jointly held between the Ford School of Public Policy and the School of Social Work.

In 2010, she won the Allan Schnaiberg Outstanding Publication Award for the book, Environment and the People in American Cities, 1600s-1900s: Disorder, Inequality, and Social Change  (Duke University Press, 2009).  Taylor was the chair of the Environment and Technology Section of the American Sociological Association from 2012 to 2013.

In 2012 Taylor became the principal investigator of a five-year United States Department of Agriculture grant  to study racial and class disparities in food access in 
the state of Michigan.

In 2014, she was celebrated by the city of San Francisco as one of 29 black environmentalists who have made “real and lasting change”.

In 2015, Taylor became the James E. Crowfoot Collegiate Professor of Environmental Justice and the Director of Diversity, Equity, and Inclusion at the University of Michigan's School for Environment and Sustainability (SEAS).

In 2018, she was celebrated by a wide range of the world's most prominent environmental organizations. She was awarded the Women in Conservation Rachel Carson Award from the National Audubon Society, the Freudenburg Lifetime Achievement Award from the Association of Environmental Science and Studies, the National Science Foundation's Presidential Award for Excellence in Science, Mathematics & Engineering, Mentoring (PAESMEM), the University of Michigan Distinguished Faculty Achievement Award, and the President's Award from the Detroit Audubon Society.

In 2021, Taylor became the first Senior Associate Dean of Diversity, Equity, and Inclusion at Yale School of the Environment.

Work on diversity in environmental organizations 

Taylor's work on racial exclusion in the environmental movement began in 1989, with her article "Blacks and the Environment: Toward an Explanation of the Concern and Action Gap between Blacks and Whites", and she authored numerous articles on the subject in the early 1990s.  In 2014, Taylor authored a groundbreaking report on diversity in environmental organizations.  The report's findings, that environmental organizations were failing to represent the diverse American population in their leadership, aroused a firestorm of controversy.  The report was commissioned by the Green 2.0 diversity initiative, which continues to track diversity data for the 40 largest environmental organization. To expand on this work, in 2018, Taylor published an updated report that examined the status of diversity in over 2,000 American environmental nonprofits and the extent to which they report their demographic characteristics and diversity activities on the GuideStar reporting system. In 2019, Taylor published new research on the lack of diversity reporting in environmental organizations.

Minority Environmental Leadership Development Initiative (MELDI) 

With funding from the Joyce Foundation, Taylor founded the Multicultural Environmental Leadership Development Initiative (MELDI) in 2003. In 2005 she organized a national conference and in 2007 an international one for the purpose of assessing the status of diversity in the environmental field and to plan for enhancing diversity in the future.  Several papers presented at the 2007 conference were published in the book, Environment and Social Justice:  An International Perspective.

Taylor also conducted four studies of diversity, funded by the Joyce Foundation, the Ford Foundation, and the National Science Foundation, and published in BioScience, Journal of Environmental Education,  Research in Social Problems and Public Policy, and Environmental Practice.

Environmental Fellows Program (EFP) 
In 2015, Taylor launched the Environmental Fellows Program (EFP) in partnership with the Environmental Grantmakers Association. The Environmental Fellows Program (EFP) is a national program that seeks to diversify the environmental and conservation philanthropic field through 12-week paid summer internships for graduate students at partner foundations and nonprofit organizations. Funders of the program include C.S. Mott, Island Foundation, New York Community Trust, Pisces Foundation, and more. The program aims to reduce barriers to entry for mid-level and senior-level jobs in environmental organizations and foundations for professionals from underrepresented backgrounds by connecting them to mentors and giving them experience in the field.

Doris Duke Conservation Scholars Program (DDCSP YSE) 
Also in 2015, Taylor began the Yale School of the Environment branch of the Doris Duke Conservation Scholars Program (DDCSP), funded by the Doris Duke Charitable Foundation. In 2020, the program moved to Yale School of the Environment with Taylor. This program is a 2-summer internship aimed at diversifying the conservation sector by giving opportunities to students from underrepresented backgrounds in the field and those committed to diversity, equity, and inclusion. Through this experience, approximately 20 undergraduates gain experience each summer through one summer of lab research and an additional summer of an internship with environmental groups.

Diversity, Equity, and Inclusion Conferences 
In 2018, the New Horizons in Conservation Conference - spearheaded by Taylor - took place in Washington, DC. More than 200 students, faculty, Environmental Program and Doris Duke Conservation Scholars Program alumni, and conservation professionals—the majority of them people of color—gathered to "celebrate and assess" diversity, equity, and inclusion in the environmental sector, marking a milestone in conservation history. "The students and young professionals who attended this conference represent the future of conservation," Taylor said of the conference, "They are multicultural, multi-faceted, and talented, and they are poised to take on leadership roles in this sector. Diversity benefits us all, and there is strength in it." Programming included an extensive speaker series, community building, and career and academic development for program alumni.

The New Horizons in Conservation Conference is now an annual gathering for people who are from underrepresented backgrounds in the conservation field and those who are committed to the principals diversity, equity, and inclusion. The event draws attendees from across the nation, in varying professions and career stages, including but not limited to undergraduate and graduate students, academics, environmental professionals, policy advocates, and elected officials. New Horizons also works to bolster the critical pipelines built by diversity pathway programs across the nation by providing spaces for participants to connect with peers, network, engage in hands-on professional development workshops and training, attend local field trips, and hear from a diverse range of leaders and visionaries in the field. The second annual New Horizons in Conservation Conference took place in Chicago, Illinois in April 2019. The third annual conference was planned to take place in Ann Arbor, Michigan, in April 2020 but was cancelled due to the COVID-19 pandemic. The conference was virtually hosted by Yale School of the Environment in 2021, with over 800 participants from multiple countries. The 2022 conference will be hosted in New Haven, Connecticut.

Justice, Equity, Diversity and Inclusion Initiative (JEDSI) 

In 2021, Taylor began the Justice, Equity, Diversity, and Sustainability Initiative (JEDSI) at Yale School of the Environment. JEDSI seeks to examine the relationship between social inequalities, lived experiences, and environmental outcomes. JEDSI currently focuses on eight primary areas of research, teaching, and practice: Environmental History
Nature, Outdoor Experiences, Attitudes, and Perceptions
Environmental Inequalities, Resilience, and Sustainability
Food and Farming:  Access, Sovereignty, Food Justice
Institutional Diversity, Transparency, and Workforce Dynamics
Diversity Pathway Programming
New Horizons in Conservation Conference
Mentoring and Profiles of Environmental Professionals of Color.

Work on environmental justice 

Taylor's award-winning book, The Environment and the People in American Cities (Duke University Press, 2009), focused on the environmental challenges American cities faced in the 17th through 20th centuries.  She documented the race, class, and gender dynamics that arose as urban dwellers tried to deal with environmental problems.  The book also demonstrated that from the outset environmental inequalities arose in American cities and were perpetuated in deliberate and unintentional ways.  An "ambitious" and 'impressive" work covering 500 years of history, The Environment and the People in American Cities is the first of three books, while the second of the series, The Rise of the American Conservation Movement (Duke University Press), was released in 2016. In it, she examines the emergence and rise of the American conservation movement from the mid-1800s to the early 1900s, demonstrating how race, class, and gender influenced every aspect of the movement from the establishment of parks to outdoor recreation and forest conservation; and the movement's links to nineteenth century ideologies. "Far-ranging," "nuanced," and "comprehensive," one scholar suggested that The Rise of the American Conservation Movement documents the movement in ways that will inspire readers to reconsider what they have been previously taught about environmental history.

Taylor's second book and third piece of her series, Toxic Communities:  Environmental Racism, Industrial Pollution, and Residential Mobility (New York University Press, 2014) chronicles the contamination of minority and low income communities in the U.S.  It examines seven different theories that have been used to explain why racial minorities and the poor are often found living adjacent to toxic facilities or undesirable land uses, and particularly challenges the assumption that minority communities have the requisite mobility to move away from such facilities. Grounded in practical examples, the book documents how the history of racially discriminatory housing policies has effectively forced minorities into proximity with polluting industries. The book incorporates insights from sociology and the study of urban development that had previously been ignored in environmental justice scholarship. One scholar suggested that, in view of Taylor's comprehensive treatment of the early history of the American environmental justice movement, her book should be "the last" to review that history in such detail, as future writers could simply refer parenthetically to her work.

Work on food insecurity 

In a project running from 2012 to 2018, Taylor collaborated with researchers from Grand Valley State University, Michigan State University, University of Michigan-Flint, Lake Superior State University, and the University of Wisconsin-Madison to work on a project that examines food insecurity in Michigan. A website known as Food Access in Michigan or FAIM, launched in August 2018.  The study examines the relationship between demographic characteristics and the distribution of food outlets in 18 small and medium-sized cities in the state. It also examines effective nutrition and behavioral interventions, and mechanisms for enhancing access to food and participation in local food initiatives. These issues are being studied in Sault Ste. Marie, Brimley/ Bay Mills, and St. Ignace - towns in the Upper Peninsula; Holland, Muskegon, Benton Harbor, and Grand Rapids in the west; Flint, Saginaw, Lansing, and Kalamazoo in the central part; and Ypsilanti, Taylor, Southfield, Warren, Pontiac, Inkster, and Dearborn in the southeast. These cities have large populations of one or more of the following racial and ethnic groups: Blacks, Hispanics, Native Americans, Asians, and Arabs.

Awards and recognition 
Inducted as a Fellow in the American College of Environmental Lawyers, 2021
Recognized by LiveKindly as one of 7 Black Environmentalists Shaping the Future, 2021 
Women in Sustainability Award, Envision Charlotte and Wells Fargo, 2020 
Seal of Michigan, Michigan Legislative Black Caucus, 2020 
Celebrated as a Black Environmental Leader, Environmental Defense Fund,2020 
Recognized by Green America as one of the 8 Black Leaders Who've Revolutionized the Climate Movement, 2020 
Recognized by AARP as one of 8 Leaders Who Carry On Martin Luther King Jr.'s Legacy, 2020 
 Wilbur Cross Medal, Yale Graduate School Alumni Association, 2020,
EcoWorks Sustainable Communities Champion Award, EcoWorks Detroit, 2020 
Featured in Women in Leadership Exhibit, Smithsonian Institution - Anacostia Museum, 2019
 National Science Foundation Presidential Award for Excellence in Science, Mathematics & Engineering Mentoring, 2018
Freudenburg Lifetime Achievement Award, Association of Environmental Science and Studies, 2018 
Women in Conservation Rachel Carson Award, the National Audubon Society, 2018 
President's Award from the Detroit Audubon Society, 2018
University of Michigan Distinguished Faculty Achievement Award, 2018 
Burton V. Barnes Award for Academic Excellence, Sierra Club Michigan Chapter, 2017 
Charles Horton Cooley Award, Michigan Sociological Association, 2015
Yale School of Forestry and Environmental Studies Outstanding Alumni Award, 2015 
Fred Buttel Distinguished Contribution Award, American Sociological Association, 2015 
 Black Environmentalists During Black History Month, San Francisco, 2014
 Harold R. Johnson Diversity Service Award, University of Michigan, 2012 
 Allan Schnaiberg Outstanding Publication Award for book, Environment and the People in American Cities, 1600s-1900s:  Disorder, Inequality, and Social Change, The Environment and Technology Section of the American Sociological Association, 2010
 Telluride Honors Program Summer Teaching Fellow.  University of Michigan, Ann Arbor, 2010
 Edward P. Bass Distinguished Visiting Environmental Scholars Program fellowship, Yale University, 2005
 Biography included in the Directory of American Scholars, 11th ed., Gale Group, MI:  Farmington Hills, 2001
 Recognition of Leadership in the Yale Forest Forum and the Seventh Forest Congress, Forest Congress Board,1996
 Profiled in the National Research Council's Excellence Through Diversity: Profiles of Forty-Two Ford Foundation Fellows, Washington, D.C., 1996
 Recognition for Outstanding Environmental Achievement, Northeastern Illinois University,1993 
 Recognition for Distinguished Service to the University and to Higher Education, Northeastern Illinois University, 1993

Selected publications

Books
Taylor, D.E. (2016). The Rise of the American Conservation Movement: Power, Privilege, and Environmental Protection. Duke University Press.
Taylor, D.E. (2014). Toxic Communities: Environmental Racism, Industrial Pollution, and Residential Mobility. New York University Press.
Taylor, D.E. (2010). Environment and Social Justice: An International Perspective Vol: 18. Emerald Group Publishing Limited.
Taylor, D.E. (2009). The Environment and the People in American Cities, 1600s-1900s: Disorder, Inequality and Social Change. Durham Duke University.

Reports

Articles

 

Taylor D.E. (2008). Diversity and the Environment: Myth-Making and the Status of Minorities in the Field. Research in Social Problems and Public Policy 15, pp. 89–148.

Taylor D.E. (2002). Race, Class, Gender and Environmentalism. U.S.D.A., Forest Service, PNW-GTR 534, Washington: Seattle.

Taylor D.E. ed (2000). Advances in Environmental Justice: Research, Theory and Methodology, American Behavioral Scientist 43.

Taylor D.E. and Winter P. (1995). Environmental Values, Ethics, and Depreciative Behavior in Wildland Settings. U.S.D.A. Pacific Southwest Research Station. General Technical Report PSW-156.

References

External links
Official faculty page

Living people
Environmental sociologists
African-American social scientists
Jamaican emigrants to the United States
1957 births
21st-century African-American people
20th-century African-American people
Environmental justice scholars